The Flower Bowl was an annual post-season American college football bowl game played at Durkee Field in Jacksonville, Florida, from 1942 to 1948.

Game results

Note, the 1949 contest scheduled between Bethune–Cookman and Florida A&M did not occur.

See also
List of college bowl games

References

Defunct college football bowls
Sports competitions in Jacksonville, Florida
Recurring sporting events established in 1942
Recurring sporting events disestablished in 1948
College football bowls in Florida